Derrington is a village west of the town of Stafford, in Staffordshire, England. For population details from the 2011 Census see under Seighford.

Derrington had an 18th-century pub, The Red Lion, but it has ceased trading. Derrington has a village hall.

The Church of England parish church of Saint Matthew is a Gothic Revival building completed in 1847.

The route of the abandoned Shropshire Union Railway between Stafford and Shrewsbury passes the village.

See also
Listed buildings in Seighford

References

External links
Derrington Village

Borough of Stafford
Villages in Staffordshire